Katrichev is a rural locality (a settlement) and the administrative center of Uralo-Akhtubinskoye Rural Settlement, Bykovsky District, Volgograd Oblast, Russia. The population was 1,897 as of 2010. There are 28 streets.

Geography 
Katrichev is located in Zavolzye, 71 km southeast of Bykovo (the district's administrative centre) by road. Mayak Oktyabrya is the nearest rural locality.

References 

Rural localities in Bykovsky District